The 2015 Ohio State Buckeyes football team represented Ohio State University in the 2015 NCAA Division I FBS football season. It was the Buckeyes' 126th season overall, the 103rd as a member of the Big Ten Conference, and second as a member of the Eastern Division. The team was led by Urban Meyer, in his fourth year as head coach, and played its home games at Ohio Stadium in Columbus, Ohio. They finished the season 12–1, 7–1 in Big Ten play, to finish in a tie for the East Division championship with Michigan State. Due to their head-to-head loss to Michigan State, they did not represent the East Division in the Big Ten Championship Game. They were invited to the Fiesta Bowl where they defeated Notre Dame.

Schedule
The Big Ten Conference released the schedule for the 2015 season on June 3, 2013. Ohio State will face all six Eastern Division opponents Indiana, Maryland, Michigan, Michigan State, Penn State and Rutgers. Ohio State will also face two Western Division opponents: rival Illinois and Minnesota. Ohio State will play four non-conference games: Virginia Tech of the Atlantic Coast Conference, Hawaii of the Mountain West Conference, and Northern Illinois and Western Michigan of the Mid-American Conference. Ohio State has one bye week during the season between their games against Rutgers and Minnesota.

‡ New Ohio Stadium attendance record

Personnel
Ohio State head coach Urban Meyer was his fourth year as the Buckeye's head coach during the 2015 season. In his previous three seasons with Ohio State, he led the Buckeyes to an overall record of 38 wins and 3 losses (38–3) and the 2014 national championship. On December 16, 2014, offensive coordinator Tom Herman accepted the head coaching position at Houston. On January 11, 2015, Ohio State announced the hiring of former Nebraska coach Tim Beck to replace Herman as co-offensive coordinator. On February 2, 2015, Stan Drayton accepted the running backs coach position with the Chicago Bears, and was replaced by former Notre Dame coach Tony Alford.

Coaching staff

Roster

Depth chart

Rankings

Game summaries

Virginia Tech

Sources:

Hawaii

Sources:

Northern Illinois

Sources:

Western Michigan

Sources:

Indiana

Sources:

Maryland

Sources:

Penn State

Sources:

"Dark Night at the Shoe" – Ohio State wears all-black uniforms for the first time in school history.

Rutgers

Sources:

Minnesota

Sources:

Illinois

Sources:

Michigan State

Sources:

Michigan

Sources:

Notre Dame–Fiesta Bowl

Sources:

2016 NFL Draft
The Buckeyes had 12 players (5 in the first round) in the 2016 NFL Draft.

In addition, 3 players were signed as undrafted free agents

Sources:

References

Ohio State
Ohio State Buckeyes football seasons
Fiesta Bowl champion seasons
Ohio State Buckeyes football